Norwood may refer to:

Norwood, Albemarle County, Virginia
Norwood, Bedford County, Virginia, site of a May 27, 2022, tornado
Norwood, Nelson County, Virginia